Zurong, Zu Rong, Zu-rong, or, variation, may refer to:

People
 Guo Zurong (born 1928), a Chinese musician
 Hu Zurong, a Chinese pole vaulter, athlete, and disability sports administrator
 Wu Zurong (吴祖荣), Chinese ambassador to Vanuatu

Fictional characters
 Yang Zu-Rong (楊祖榮), a fictional character from King Flower (金大花的華麗冒險)

Other uses
 Zurong, Debao County, Debao County, Guangxi, China; a town; see List of township-level divisions of Guangxi

See also

 Zhurong (disambiguation)

 Rong (disambiguation)
 Zu (disambiguation)

Chinese given names